Lyman Township is one of twelve townships in Ford County, Illinois, USA.  As of the 2010 census, its population was 518 and it contained 272 housing units.  The township was formed from a portion of Brenton Township on September 9, 1867.

Geography

Cities, towns, villages
 Roberts

Major highways
  Illinois Route 54
  Illinois Route 115

Airports and landing strips
 John H Garrelts Airport
 Otto Junior Airport
 Roberts RLA Airport.  Roberts RLA is now closed and is cropland.

Demographics

School districts
 Gibson City-Melvin-Sibley Community Unit School District 5
 Iroquois West Community Unit School District 10
 Paxton-Buckley-Loda Community Unit School District 10
 Prairie Central Community Unit School District 8
 Tri Point Community Unit School District 6-J

Political districts
 Illinois' 15th congressional district
 State House District 105
 State Senate District 53

References
 
 United States Census Bureau 2007 TIGER/Line Shapefiles
 United States National Atlas

External links
 City-Data.com
 Illinois State Archives

Townships in Ford County, Illinois
Townships in Illinois